Malis (from  – "jasmine") is a Cambodian restaurant opened in 2004 in Phnom Penh, the first Cambodian fine dining restaurant in the city. To design the restaurant's menu chef Luu Meng travelled throughout Cambodia for six months and collected traditional recipes, which he presented using farm-sourced ingredients and modern cooking techniques. In 2011 Malis won the Tourism Alliance Award as the Restaurant of the Year at the International Travel Expo in Ho Chi Minh City.

In 2016, another Malis restaurant was opened in Pokambor Avenue in Siem Reap. The opening was attended by the Secretary of State Kong Vibol, Minister of Industry and Handicrafts Cham Prasidh and Director General of APSARA Sum Map. In 2019 the restaurants unveiled their revamped menu. Malis is often regarded as one of the best Cambodian restaurants in both Phnom Penh
and Siem Reap.

References

External links
 

2004 establishments in Cambodia
Restaurants established in 2004
Restaurants in Cambodia
Cambodian restaurants